Peter Hitjitevi Katjavivi (born 12 May 1941) is a Namibian politician who is the Speaker of the National Assembly of Namibia since March 2015 and the chancellor of the Namibia University of Science and Technology from 1992 to 2003. Previously he was the founding Vice-Chancellor of the University of Namibia from 1992 to 2003, Ambassador to the European Union from 2003 to 2006, Ambassador to Germany from 2006 to 2008, and Director General of the National Planning Commission from 2008 to 2010.

Life and career
Peter Katjavivi was born in Okahandja, and attended a primary school in Windhoek, then the Augustineum Secondary School in Okahandja (1960–61) and the Government College Umuahia, Nigeria (1963-1966). In 1966/67 he began studying History, Law and Political Science at the University of Dar es Salaam, Tanzania. Katjavivi joined SWAPO in the 1960s and was head of SWAPO's overseas offices in London. In 1986 he obtained a doctorate (DPhil) at St Antony's College, Oxford.

In 1989, he was a member of the Constituent Assembly of Namibia. From 1992 to 2003 he was Vice-Chancellor of the University of Namibia, the foundation of which he had significant influence. Katjavivi was a member of numerous national and international educational, cultural and research organizations. He served as President of the Namibia Economic Policy Research Unit beginning in 1990, as Chairman of the Council of National Monuments (now the National Heritage Council of Namibia) from 1992 to 2000, and as an Executive Council Member of UNESCO from 1993 to 1997. From 2003 to 2006 he was Namibia's Ambassador to the European Union in Brussels, and from 2006 to 2008, Ambassador to Germany. He was appointed as Director-General of the National Planning Commission on 8 April 2008.

Following the November 2009 parliamentary election, President Hifikepunye Pohamba appointed Katjavivi to the National Assembly as one of the six non-voting members of parliament appointed by the President for the term that began in March 2010. Subsequently, he was SWAPO's Chief Whip in the National Assembly. He was elected to the National Assembly in the November 2014 parliamentary election as a SWAPO candidate. When the National Assembly began sitting for its new term on 20 March 2015, Katjavivi was sworn in as Speaker of Parliament, succeeding Theo-Ben Gurirab. In 2016 he was appointed chancellor of the Namibia University of Science and Technology (NUST).

Personal life
Katjavivi was married to a British woman Jane, and has five children. Besides his native Herero he speaks five other languages.

Awards
Ordre des Palmes Académiques , France, 1996
Distinguished academic visitor award, New Delhi, India, 1998
Honorary Doctorate of the University of Joensuu, Finland, 1999
Certificate of Service to the Executive Council of the Association of African Universities (AAU), 2002
Most Brilliant Order of the Sun, First Class, Heroes' Day 2014

Publications
The Road to Namibian Independence, Gamsberg Macmillan, Windhoek.
Church and Liberation in Namibia, Zwan Publications, London, 1989.
A History of Resistance in Namibia, James Currey, London, 1988

References

External links 

 Interview with Peter Katjavivi by Tor Sellström within the project Nordic Documentation on the Liberation Struggle in Southern Africa – dated 20 March 1995

1941 births
Living people
Alumni of St Antony's College, Oxford
Government College Umuahia alumni
Herero people
Namibia University of Science and Technology
Namibian diplomats
People from Okahandja
Speakers of the National Assembly (Namibia)
SWAPO politicians
University of Dar es Salaam alumni
University of Namibia